The Bling Lagosians is a 2019 Nigerian drama film, written by Anthony Kehinde Joseph and directed and co-produced by Bolanle Austen-Peters. It premiered on June 16, 2019 in Lagos. It stars Bunmi Aboderin, Toyin Abraham, Tana Adelana, Osas Ighodaro, Alexx Ekubo, Ayoola Ayolola, and Jide Kosoko.

Premise
The Bling Lagosians centers around the Holloways, a wealthy Lagos family and their mother Mopelola, who is about to celebrate her 51st birthday party. There are individual feuds and fights between family members. Their father Akin takes steps to prevent the foreclosure of the family's business by the Asset Management Corporation.

Cast
Demidun - Osas Ighodaro Ajibade
Tokunbo - Sharon Ooja
George - Jimmy Odukoya
Akin Holloway played by Gbenga Titiloye
Mopelola Holloway - Elvina Ibru
Nnamdi Agu - Alexx Ekubo
Baba Eko - Jide Kosoko
Oge Briggs - Winihin Jemede
Adunni Fernandez aka Iya Oge - Toyin Abraham

Awards and nominations

References

2019 films
Films set in Lagos
Films about families
2010s English-language films